John L. Sievenpiper is a Canadian nutrition scientist and associate professor at the University of Toronto's Department of Nutritional Sciences. He is known for his research on fructose and weight gain, which has reported that fructose does not have any more adverse health effects than other sources of calories. However, in March 2015 the World Health Organization recommended to reduce sugars intake among adults and children.

Criticism
Sievenpiper's statements on fructose metabolism and weight gain were attempted to be disputed in independently funded studies of clinical research on obesity and metabolic syndrome. Lustig's experiments that contradicted Sievenpiper's statements were later revealed to be poorly done by peers and others in the field. He has come under fire for his research because some of it has been funded by the sugar and soft drink industries; he has also been retained as an expert witness by the Corn Refiners Association.

References

External links
Faculty page

Canadian nutritionists
Living people
Academic staff of the University of Toronto
Year of birth missing (living people)